Tawa Nagar is a town in Madhya Pradesh state of India. It is located in near Itarsi Junction in Narmadapuram district. Itarsi is a key hub for agricultural goods and is the biggest, oldest & the busiest railway junctions in Madhya Pradesh. Rail services from all 4 major metropolitan cities of India namely Mumbai to Calcutta and Delhi to Chennai pass through Itarsi. It has Ordnance Factory Itarsi of the Ordnance Factories Board which manufactures products for the Indian Armed Forces. The Bori Wildlife Sanctuary and Tawa Dam are nearby.

Tawa

The Tawa Dam & Reservoir offers a scenic escape from the hustle bustle of city life. It is set amidst lush greenery, and offers much scope for adventure. Sunsets viewed from the dam are especially enchanting. Even more enchanting is the lake cruise, which takes you on a serene hour-long ride along the dreamy little islands dotting the reservoir and the panoramic hills of the Satpura to Churna. Here you can indulge in a jungle safari at the Satpura Tiger Reserve.

Demographics 

Tawanagar is a very small village with population of 4561 people, consisting of 2440 males and 2121 females. Majority of people employed by Irrigation Department of Madhya Pradesh State Government.

Geography 

Tawanagar is surrounded by Satpura Range. It is located beside the Tawa Reservoir on the Tawa River.

Transport 
Any one can reach Tawanagar  it is only 30 km from itarsi and 12 km from NH-69(dhanyawaad). nearest railway station is itarsi. Itarsi is one of the major junctions in India, at the crossing of important east–west and north–south routes. Itarsi comes under West Central Railway zone whose headquarters is in Jabalpur. Itarsi is connected via broad gauge lines to Bhopal and Delhi to the north, Bhusawal and Mumbai to the west, the railway junctions of Nagpur to the south and Jabalpurto the east. Rail services from Mumbai to Guwahati and Delhi to Chennai pass through Itarsi. 250 trains are daily passing through. Itarsi runs one express train — Vindhyachal express — and it runs three passenger trains in Jabalpur route daily. Itarsi is the busy railway station in Bhopal division. The new platforms 6 and 7 opened for Jabalpur, Nagpur and Bhusawal routes.

Education 
In Tawanagar there two higher secondary schools, Model higher secondary (boarding) and government higher secondary school. the major role play by the model school in education it is the only school in that place where nearby villagers student come and study there, there  hostels and  other facilities are provided by the govt. In tawanagar only Hindi medium education are provided. Most of the students are from model school are in today Indian army, and other government post.

Tawanagar videos 
 Tawanagar tawa resort top view drone. by Allen Webstar

Tourism 

Main visitor attractions in Tawa Nagar include:

 Tawa Reservoir
 Tawa Resort
 Chaurasi Baba (Sacred Place)
 Gaurishah baba mazaar
 Bori Reserve

References 

Villages in Narmadapuram district